Torquato Mazzoni (1824 - after 1869) was an Italian painter.

Life and career 
He studied in the Academy of Fine Arts in Florence under Giuseppe Bezzuoli, and painted in Montepulciano.

References

1824 births
Year of death unknown
19th-century Italian painters
Italian male painters
Accademia di Belle Arti di Firenze alumni
19th-century Italian male artists